The 1987 NSL Cup Final was the 11th final of the NSL Cup. The final was contested two-legged home-and-away format between Sydney Croatia and South Melbourne. The first leg was hosted by Sydney Croatia at St George Stadium in Sydney on 14 October 1987, while the second leg was hosted by South Melbourne at Olympic Park in Melbourne on 18 October 1987. Sydney Croatia won 2–0 on aggregate.

Route to the final

Sydney Croatia
Sydney Croatia started their 1987 NSL Cup campaign by winning against locals APIA Leichhardt 2–1 in the first round at home on. They defeated St George-Budapest 3–0 in the quarter-finals. In the semi-finals, they won on penalties against Heidelberg United to progress to their first NSL Cup Final.

South Melbourne
South Melbourne had a bye in the first round of this NSL campaign until they won 2–0 against Preston Makedonia in the quarter-finals. The semi-final was won 4–1 against Marconi Fairfield to progress to the Final.

Matches

First leg

Details

Second leg

Details

References

Sydney United 58 FC matches
South Melbourne FC matches